Quintus Mucius Scaevola may refer to one of the following politicians of the Roman Republic:

 Quintus Mucius Scaevola (consul 174 BC), believed to be the son of his namesake who was praetor in 215 BC
 Quintus Mucius Scaevola (praetor 215 BC), governor of Sardinia
 Quintus Mucius Scaevola Augur (c. 159 – 88 BC), consul 117 BC
 Quintus Mucius Scaevola Pontifex (140–82 BC), consul 95 BC